is a rechargeable contactless smart card ticketing system for public transport in Toyama, Japan, introduced by Toyama Light Rail, from April 29, 2006. The card is accepted by Toyamakō Line, the only line the company operates. Just like JR East's Suica or JR West's ICOCA, the card uses RFID technology developed by Sony corporation known as FeliCa. However, pass-ca has no known plan to have integrated services with those other cards.

Types of cards 

 pass-ca prepaid cards
 Normal card
 Child's card
 Special discount card: for handicapped customers.
 pass-ca commuter pass
 Keirin only pass-ca: for Keirin spectators. On a racing day, one lap to/from Keirinjō-mae (Keirin velodrome) Station becomes free of charge.

External links 

  Official website by Toyama Light Rail

Contactless smart cards
Fare collection systems in Japan
2006 establishments in Japan

ja:富山ライトレール富山港線#.E9.81.8B.E8.B3.83.E3.83.BB.E4.B9.97.E9.99.8D.E3.81.AA.E3.81.A9